The 2021 Khyber Pakhtunkhwa local elections were held in 17 districts of Khyber Pakhtunkhwa, Pakistan on 19 December 2021. Jamiat Ulema-e-Islam (F) won the most seats. In second phase PTI won the most wote by 31 seats while JUI-f won 5 seats and independent won 12 seats.

First phase
First phase of election were held on 19 December 2021 17 districts.

Re-voting
On 13 February 2022 re-voting of the first phase were held in 13 different districts.

Mayoral elections

Second phase
The second phase will be held in March in the remaining districts.

See also
2015 Khyber Pakhtunkhwa local elections

References

2021 elections in Pakistan
Local elections
December 2021 events in Asia
Local elections in Pakistan
2021 local elections